The 1988 Copa Nabisco Royal Open, also known as the Buenos Aires Grand Prix, was a men's Grand Prix tennis men's tournament held in on outdoor clay courts in Buenos Aires, Argentina. It was the 20th edition of the tournament and was held from 7 November through 14 November 1988. Seventh-seeded Javier Sánchez won the singles title.

Finals

Singles

 Javier Sánchez defeated  Guillermo Pérez Roldán 6–2, 7–6
 It was Sánchez's 3rd title of the year and the 5th of his career.

Doubles

 Carlos Costa /  Javier Sánchez defeated  Eduardo Bengoechea /  José Luis Clerc 6–3, 3–6, 6–3
 It was Costa's only title of the year and the 1st of his career. It was Sánchez's 2nd title of the year and the 4th of his career.

References

External links 
 ITF tournament edition details

 
Copa Nabisco Royal Open
South American Championships
November 1988 sports events in South America